Chadwick Paul Penney (born September 18, 1973) is a Canadian former professional ice hockey player. A career minor leaguer, Penney played three games in the National Hockey League for the Ottawa Senators during the 1993–94 season. Penney was highly regarded by many as the future left winger to Alexei Yashin after being drafted. Despite impressive numbers with the OHL's North Bay Centennials and later with the AHL's Prince Edward Island Senators, Penney was never to realize his potential at the NHL level. He is the second player from Labrador to play in the NHL. Dan LaCosta, Pascal Pelletier, and Darryl Williams are the only other three players from Labrador to make it to the NHL. Penney was born in Labrador City, Newfoundland and Labrador.

Junior hockey

North Bay Centennials (1990–1993)
Penney joined the North Bay Centennials of the OHL in the 1990-91 season, where in 66 games, he scored 34 goals and 67 points to finish fifth in team scoring, helping North Bay into the post-season. In 10 playoff games, Penney scored two goals and eight points.

In 1991-92, Penney struggled offensively, as his numbers dropped to 25 goals and 52 points in 57 games with North Bay. In the post-season, Penney finished third in team scoring, scoring 13 goals and 30 points in 21 games, as the Centennials lost to the Sault Ste. Marie Greyhounds in the OHL finals.

Penney began the 1992-93 with the Centennials, where in 18 games, he scored eight goals and 15 points. Penney was then traded from the rebuilding Centennials to the Sault Ste. Marie Greyhounds.

Sault Ste. Marie Greyhounds (1992–1993)
After starting the 1992-93 season with the North Bay Centennials, Penney finished the season with the Sault Ste. Marie Greyhounds. In 48 games with the Greyhounds, Penney scored 28 goals and 73 points, helping the club reach the post-season. In the playoffs, Penney scored seven goals and 17 points in 18 games as the Greyhounds lost to the Peterborough Petes in the OHL finals.

With Sault Ste. Marie hosting the 1993 Memorial Cup, the Greyhounds were automatically entered into the tournament as the host team.  In four games, Penney scored five goals and seven points, helping the Greyhounds win the Memorial Cup.  Penney was named to the Memorial Cup all-star team.

Professional career

Ottawa Senators (1992–1996)
Penney was drafted by the Ottawa Senators in the second round, 25th overall, at the 1992 NHL Entry Draft held at the Montreal Forum.

He began his professional hockey career with the Prince Edward Island Senators of the AHL in 1993-94, as in 73 games, Penney scored 20 goals and 50 points.  Penney also saw some action with the Ottawa Senators during the 1993-94, as on October 21, 1993, he played in his first NHL game, as Penney was held off the scoresheet in a 6–5 loss to the Dallas Stars.  Penney appeared in two more games with Ottawa, getting no points.

Penney spent the entire 1994-95 season with PEI, scoring 16 goals and 32 points in 66 games.  In 11 playoff games, Penney scored two goals and four points.

In 1995-96, Penney saw his offensive numbers improve, scoring 23 goals and 60 points in 79 games, helping PEI reach the post-season once again.  In three playoff games, Penney had a goal and two points.

Manchester Storm (1996–1997)
Penney headed to Great Britain and played for the Manchester Storm of the British Ice Hockey Superleague for the 1996–97 season.  In 39 games, Penney scored nine goals and 25 points for the Storm.

Kentucky Thoroughblades (1997–1998)
Penney returned to the AHL for the 1997-98 season, playing for the Kentucky Thoroughblades.  In 78 games, Penney had 16 goals and 37 points.  In two playoff games, Penney did not earn any points.

Colorado Gold Kings (1998–1999)
Penney signed with the Colorado Gold Kings of the WCHL for the 1998-99 season.  In 67 games, Penney scored 31 goals and 77 points, finishing fourth in team scoring, helping Colorado reach the post-season.  In three playoff games, Penney had two assists.

Career statistics

Regular season and playoffs

International

External links
 

1973 births
Living people
Canadian ice hockey forwards
Colorado Gold Kings players
Ice hockey people from Newfoundland and Labrador
Kentucky Thoroughblades players
Manchester Storm (1995–2002) players
Ottawa Senators draft picks
Ottawa Senators players
People from Labrador City
Prince Edward Island Senators players
Sault Ste. Marie Greyhounds players